Rauchkofel, sometimes also Rauhkofel, may refer to several mountains in the Alps:

Austria
Rauchkofel (Zillertal Alps) (3,251 m), also called the Rauhkofel, in the Zillertal Alps
Rauchkofel (Rieserferner Group) (3,043 m), in the Rieserferner Group
Rauchkofel (Carnic Alps) (2,460 m), in the Carnic Alps
Rauchkofel (Abfaltersbach) (1,959 m), near Abfaltersbach
Rauchkofel (Lienz) (1,910 m), also called the Rauhkofel, in East Tyrol

Italy
Rauchkofel (Durreck Group) (2,653 m), in the Durreck range in the Venediger Group

de:Rauhkofel